Cedrik-Marcel Stebe was the defending champion but chose not to defend his title.

Dan Evans won the title after defeating Jason Kubler 4–6, 7–5, 7–6(7–3) in the final.

Seeds

Draw

Finals

Top half

Bottom half

References
Main Draw
Qualifying Draw

Odlum Brown Vancouver Open - Men's Singles
2018 Men's Singles